This is a list of songs about Pakistan (known as Milli naghmay) listed in alphabetical order. The list includes songs by current and former solo-singers and musical bands. It also includes some film songs originally recorded for Pakistani films.

List of songs

References

Songs